Amridge University is a private university affiliated with the Churches of Christ with its main campus in Montgomery, Alabama. It was previously known as  Alabama Christian School of Religion, Southern Christian University, and Regions University, and is a successor institution to Alabama Christian College.

Founded in 1967 as the Alabama Christian School of Religion, its primary function historically has been as a theological seminary to train ministers in Bible and Christian Counseling. However, Amridge has expanded its curricula to other degrees. Seminary training offered by the Turner School of Theology, named in honor of founder Rex Allwin Turner Sr. and his wife Opal Shipp Turner, continues to be a core undertaking, with all levels of ministry and theological degrees available.

History

Key institutional events

 1942 Montgomery Bible School, founded by Rex Allwin Turner Sr., Calvin Leonard Johnson, and Joseph B. "Joe" Greer, offered both high school and first year college courses, and became a junior college with an elementary and secondary department
 1949 Expanded curricula to include a third year of Bible and related courses
 1953 Granted first baccalaureate degrees
 1954 Institution's name changed to Alabama Christian College
 1966 Discontinued upper‑level program in religious studies to satisfy accreditation requirements as a junior college
 High school department became Alabama Christian Academy, a regionally accredited elementary and secondary school
 Junior college department became what today is Faulkner University
 1967 Alabama Christian School of Religion founded to assume the upper-level program, offering classes in the new facilities of the College Church of Christ at 5315 Atlanta Highway
 1972 Expanded curricula to include graduate degree programs
 1974 Moved to new property jointly purchased with the Landmark Church of Christ at 6020 Atlanta Highway
 1977 Expanded curricula to include a three‑year graduate program offering the Master of Theology degree
 1985 Applied for accredited membership in the Southern Association of Colleges and Schools
 1988 Replaced the Master of Theology degree to conform to standard nomenclature and practice with the Master of Divinity degree, generally recognized as the first professional degree in ministry
The School of Religion moved to this new campus at 1200 Taylor Road that summer.
 1989 Received accreditation by the Southern Association of Colleges and Schools to grant degrees at the bachelor's and master's levels
 1991 Institution's name changed to Southern Christian University to reflect the widened geographical area served by the institution and emphasized the academic level and the emerging direction of the institution
 1992 Expanded curricula by adding the Doctor of Ministry (D.Min.) degree and the distance-learning program
 1994 Reaffirmation by the Southern Association of Colleges and Schools including the two aforementioned substantive changes
 1994 Changes in Alabama state licensure law in Family Therapy grandfathered the institution to permit reconfiguration of its counseling program
 1999 Selected by the US Department of Education to help pilot the Distance Education Demonstration Program
 2003 Southern Association of Colleges and Schools approved Doctor of Philosophy (Ph.D.) in Family Therapy degree program
 2005 Decadal reaffirmation by the Southern Association of Colleges and Schools including the following substantive changes in its curricula
 Bachelor of Science in Business Administration – General Business
 Bachelor of Science in Business Administration – Information Communication
 Bachelor of Science in Business Administration – Information Systems Management
 Doctor of Philosophy in Biblical Studies degree
 2006 Southern Association of Colleges and Schools approved Associate of Arts degree program
 2006 Institution's name changed to Regions University
 2008 Institution's name changed to Amridge University

2006-2008 name changes
On August 2, 2006, Southern Christian University's board of regents voted to change the institution's name to Regions University. They expected this would enhance the institution's opportunities, complementing its purpose and vision while expanding its scope of educational and religious heritage to all the regions of the world. The name change, however, sparked a civil lawsuit by Regions Financial Corporation filed on September 29, 2006, for trademark infringement.  Consequently, on January 31, 2008, the board of regents resolved to change the institution's name again, this time to Amridge University, preserving its mission and vision to expand its operations worldwide.

Presidents

 Rex Allwin Turner Sr., Ed.D. 1967 – 1983
 Rex Allwin Turner Jr., Ed.D. 1983 – August 2008
 Stanley Douglas Paterson, Ed.D. (interim) August 2008 - March 2009
 Michael Clark Turner, D.O. March 2009 – present

Academics
In keeping with its Christian heritage, Amridge University provides educational opportunities through five schools: the College of Business and Leadership, the College of General Studies, the School of Education and Human Services, the Turner School of Theology, and the School of Continuing Education. It is accredited by the Southern Association of Colleges and Schools. Additionally, it is approved by the Alabama Department of Postsecondary Education and the Tennessee Higher Education Commission.

Facilities

Campuses

The institution's main campus in Montgomery, Alabama lies alongside Auburn University Montgomery just north of Interstate 85 at the Taylor Road exit. The campus consists of a single two-story complex, the Morgan W. Brown Building, that houses classrooms and the library on the ground floor and administrative offices upstairs. Classrooms are equipped with extensive multimedia equipment to allow live Internet streaming of instruction and lecture. Instructors can also transmit computer data, video, or still pictures. Each student's desk has a computer workstation. There is building-wide Wi-Fi access.

Libraries

The Amridge University library features a large collection of religious books and theological reference works. It holds 80,000 titles, 1,200 serial subscriptions, and 800 audiovisual materials. The library is linked with other libraries across the US to ensure availability of books that may be borrowed through interlibrary lending. Its card catalog is accessible for online searching by students, faculty, and staff.

References

External links
 Official website

Private universities and colleges in Alabama
Universities and colleges in Montgomery, Alabama
Educational institutions established in 1967
Universities and colleges accredited by the Southern Association of Colleges and Schools
1967 establishments in Alabama